M7GpppN-mRNA hydrolase (DCP2, NUDT16, D10 protein, D9 protein, D10 decapping enzyme, decapping enzyme) is an enzyme with systematic name m7GpppN-mRNA m7GDP phosphohydrolase. This enzyme catalyses the following chemical reaction

 m7G5'ppp5'-mRNA + H2O  m7GDP + 5'-phospho-mRNA

Decapping of mRNA is essential in eukaryotic mRNA turnover.

References

External links 
 

EC 3.6.1